Peter Cortes (born September 7, 1947) is an American rower. He competed in the men's quadruple sculls event at the 1976 Summer Olympics.

References

1947 births
Living people
American male rowers
Olympic rowers of the United States
Rowers at the 1976 Summer Olympics
People from Orange, New Jersey
Sportspeople from Essex County, New Jersey
Cornell University alumni